The GE U30B was a diesel-electric locomotive produced by GE Transportation between 1966 and 1975. It was a further development of the U28B, with a  16-cylinder prime mover. The U30B competed with the EMD GP40 and the ALCO Century 430, but was not as successful as the GE U30C.

After the merger between the Western Pacific and the Union Pacific, U30B 3051 was donated to the Western Pacific Railroad Museum in 1985.

Original owners

References

External links
 
 Thompson, David. U30B Original Owners

U30B
B-B locomotives
Diesel-electric locomotives of the United States
Railway locomotives introduced in 1966
Freight locomotives
Standard gauge locomotives of the United States